Gastrotheca longipes, also known as the Pastaza marsupial frog, is a species of frog in the family Hemiphractidae.
It is found in Ecuador and Peru.
Its natural habitats are subtropical or tropical moist lowland forests and subtropical or tropical moist montane forests.

References

Sources
Comparative Toxicogenomics Database: Gastrotheca longipes
Breathing Space: Gastrotheca longipes

Gastrotheca
Amphibians of Colombia
Amphibians of Ecuador
Taxonomy articles created by Polbot
Amphibians described in 1882